The 2006 UC Santa Barbara Gauchos men's soccer team represented the University of California, Santa Barbara during the 2006 NCAA Division I men's soccer season. It was the 41st season of the team fielding a varsity college soccer team, and their 24th season playing in the Big West Conference.

The season was highlighted by the Gauchos winning their first NCAA Division I Men's Soccer Championship, in which they won the final against UCLA Bruins in the final in St. Louis. It was the first season since 1989 that a team from a mid-major conference won the NCAA Championship, a feat that would not be accomplished until the University of Akron did so in 2010.

Background 
Following a debut College Cup run in 2004, the Gauchos had a relative slump in 2005, finishing with a 13–5–3 overall record, and a 7–1–2 Big West record, good enough for second in the conference. The Gauchos finished the season ranked 23rd in the nation. Despite not winning the Big West championship, UCSB earned an at-large berth into the 2005 NCAA Division I Men's Soccer Championship, there they advanced to the second round, before losing 3–2 to conference rival, Cal State Northridge.

Review 
Prior to the start of preseason, UCSB defender and two-time All-American, Andy Iro was named to the Hermann Trophy watch list. Iro was also the reigning Big West Defensive Player of the Year. Additionally, the squad entered the season ranked 21st in the nation, and was composed of the 22nd strongest recruiting class. The recruiting class featured future MLS all-stars including Eric Avila and Chris Pontius. In the Big West preseason coaches poll, UCSB was picked to win the conference title.

Ahead of the 2006 regular season, the Gauchos played Westmont College for the 42nd Annual Bryant and Sons Cup, a pre-season friendly that pits the two Santa Barbara universities against each other in a soccer match. Played in front of 1,000 spectators at Harder Stadium, the Gauchos emerged victorious, with a 6–0 victory over the Warriors. Bongomin Otti netted a hat trick in the match while Bryan Byrne netted two goals. Nick Perera added a goal in the 90th minute to cap off the result.

The regular season began with a cross country flight to Virginia, where the Gauchos participated in the UVA Soccer Classic in Charlottesville, Virginia. Their opening game was against the seventh ranked Akron Zips, where they won in a convincing 5–0 victory. Otii and Avila both netted two goals for the Gauchos, along with a single goal from Tino Nuñez.

Roster 
Final 2006 roster.

Schedule 

|-
!colspan=6 style=""| Exhibition
|-

|-
!colspan=6 style=""| Regular season
|-

|-
!colspan=6 style=""| NCAA Tournament

|-
!colspan=6 style=""| NCAA College Cup

References

External links 
 UCSB Soccer

UC Santa Barbara Gauchos men's soccer seasons
2006 UC Santa Barbara Gauchos
Ucsb
Ucsb
NCAA Division I Men's Soccer Tournament-winning seasons
NCAA Division I Men's Soccer Tournament College Cup seasons
UCSB